Robert Lawson may refer to:

Robert Lawson (architect) (1833–1902), Scottish architect who emigrated to New Zealand
Robert Lawson (author) (1892–1957), American author and artist
Robert Lawson (British Army officer) (died 1816), Royal Artillery officer
Robert Lawson (cricketer) (1901–1974), Australian cricketer
Robert Lawson (high sheriff), English official of Northumberland
Robert Lawson (South Australian politician) (born 1944), Liberal member of the South Australian Legislative Council
Robert Lawson (Victorian politician) (born 1927), Liberal member of the Victorian Legislative Council
Robert Lawson (racing driver), runner-up in the 2008 SEAT Cupra Championship
Robert Lawson (screenwriter), screenwriter of What Goes Up
Robert Lawson (Virginia) (1748–1805), American Revolutionary War militia general
Robert C. Lawson (1883–1961), American clergyman, founder of the Church of Our Lord Jesus Christ
Robert G. Lawson (born 1938), American law professor at the University of Kentucky College of Law
Robert R. Lawson (c. 1872–1934), New York state senator
Robert W. Lawson (c. 1889–1960), British physicist
Bob Lawson (Robert Baker Lawson, 1875–1952), baseball player